Zuojiazhuang Subdistrict is a subdistrict of Chaoyang District, Beijing. 2020, it has a total population of 70,245

History

Administrative Division 
At the end of 2021, the subdistrict has 11 communities under it:

See also
List of township-level divisions of Beijing

References

Chaoyang District, Beijing
Subdistricts of Beijing